Mystic Chords of Memory is the debut studio album by American alternative rock band Mystic Chords of Memory. It was released on Rough Trade Records in 2004.

Critical reception

Tim Sendra of AllMusic gave the album 4 stars out of 5, commenting that "It has the feel of a classic bedroom/basement recording -- which is to say, relaxed and free of pressure." Cam Lindsay of Exclaim! wrote, "The snail-paced placidity, fabricated by sounds of the sea and the harp, makes a good portion of the record feel like an extended lull." Amanda Petrusich of Pitchfork gave the album a 7.7 out of 10 and praised "its soft melodies, sweet vocals, and scratchy DIY production".

Track listing

Personnel
Credits adapted from liner notes.

 Chris Gunst – vocals, guitar, keyboards, drums, sampler, melodica, autoharp
 Jen Cohen – vocals, bass guitar, drums, harp
 Ben Knight – guitar (2–5), vocals (5)
 Scott Coffey – violin (3, 5, 7, 10)

References

External links
 

2004 debut albums
Mystic Chords of Memory albums
Rough Trade Records albums